Xu Huaizhong (born 29 September 1929) is a Chinese novelist. He is best known for his novel Qianfengji which won the 10th Mao Dun Literature Prize (2019), one of the most prestigious literature prizes in China.

Biography
Xu was born Xu Huaizhong in Handan, Hebei, on September 29, 1929. At the age of 12, he went to school in the counter-Japanese base area of Taihang Mountains. After high school in 1945, he joined the People's Liberation Army, where he was in charge of art and propaganda. He joined the Communist Party of China in the following year. In 1950 he was researcher at the Cultural Work Corps of Political Department of Southwest Military Region. He started to publish works in 1954, when he published his first novella The Rainbow on the Earth. He worked as an assistant in the Cultural Department of the Political Department of Kunming Army in 1955. In 1956, his first novel, We Sow Love, was published. In 1958, he served as editor of the supplement of PLA Daily. In 1973 he was promoted to deputy director of the Department of Culture of Kunming Military District. After the Cultural Revolution in 1978, he became a screenwriter at the August First Film Studio and subsequently as director of the Department of Literature of People's Liberation Army Academy of Art and director of the Department of Culture of People's Liberation Army General Political Department. He was awarded the rank of Major General (Shaojiang) in 1988.

Works
 
English translation:

Awards
 1983 The Anecdote on Western Route won National Award for Excellent Short Story Creation
 2014 Bottom Color won the Sixth Lu Xun Literature Award Reportage Award
 2019 Qianfengji won the 10th Mao Dun Literature Prize

References

External links
 Xu Huaizhong on Chinawriter.com 

1929 births
Living people
People from Handan
Writers from Hebei
People's Liberation Army generals from Hebei
20th-century novelists
21st-century novelists
20th-century Chinese male writers
Mao Dun Literature Prize laureates
Chinese male novelists